The Cape Town Railway & Dock 0-4-2 of 1860 was a South African steam locomotive from the pre-Union era in the Cape of Good Hope.

In 1860, the Cape Town Railway and Dock Company took delivery of eight  broad gauge tender locomotives with a 0-4-2 wheel arrangement, the first tender locomotives to work in South Africa. They were acquired for service on the Cape Town-Wellington railway, which was still under construction.

In 1872, these locomotives came onto the roster of the Cape Government Railways, which took over the operation of all railways in the Cape of Good Hope. They remained in service on the Wellington line while it was being converted to dual broad-and-Cape gauges from 1872, and were only retired in 1881 when sufficient Cape gauge locomotives were in service.

The Cape Town-Wellington Railway
The first railway line in the Cape of Good Hope, the Cape Town-Wellington Railway, was built by the Cape Town Railway and Dock Company. The company appointed Messrs. Pickering as contractors for the construction of the line.

The Act specified, amongst others, that:
 The locomotives for the railway should have only four wheels, since this would require less room inside buildings and would only need an  turntable.
 A locomotive, complete with apparatus and appendages, should only weigh .
 Each locomotive have to be shopped, cleaned and, if necessary, repaired after every three days of work.
 Double the number of locomotives as required by the volume of traffic should therefore be kept in use.
 At least twelve locomotives should be ordered, at a nominal figure of £800 each.

Since progress in locomotive design had already advanced beyond the Cape Government's specifications of 1857, the maximum weight and wheel arrangement specifications were, wisely, ignored by the Cape Town Railway and Dock Company.

As in England, it was decided to use  broad gauge. The first sod was turned on 31 March 1859 by Sir George Grey, Governor of the Cape Colony from 1854 to 1861, but the planned railhead at Wellington was only reached on 4 November 1863, after the contractors, Messrs. E. & J. Pickering, had been dismissed in October 1861 and construction was taken over by the Company itself.

Manufacturer
In 1859, an order was placed with R and W Hawthorn in Newcastle upon Tyne in England for eight  tender locomotives. These engines, which arrived in two shipments on 20 March and 28 April 1860, were given names and were numbered from 1 to 8. Since the full complement of engines arrived when the construction of the line to Wellington had barely begun, they were erected and placed on display for the public, while awaiting the completion of sufficient track to be useful. They eventually entered service on 20 October 1860.

The locomotives were the first tender locomotives to work in South Africa. They were painted in a green livery, very similar in shade to that of the Great Western Railway in England. It was to become the standard passenger livery of the Cape Government Railways, right up to the establishment of the South African Railways in 1910. The locomotives were delivered without cabs, but cab sides and a roof were soon installed in addition to the weatherboard to offer better protection to the crew.

Service

Cape Town Railway and Dock
The public was allowed to ride for the first time on 26 December 1860, on the line which was only to reach Salt River on 8 February 1861, a distance of only  which took the contractor nearly two years to complete. This snail's pace led to a dispute between Cape Town Railway and Dock and the contractor, which eventually ended in sabotage in October 1861. Upon being dismissed, the disgruntled contractor employees ran one of the new locomotives, no. 4 Wellington, into a culvert, with the result that it had to be sent to the newly established workshops at Salt River to have some serious damage repaired.

On one occasion a train, with the unpopular Cape Governor Sir Philip Wodehouse on board, reached  on the section between D'Urban Road (now Bellville) and Salt River.

The line from Cape Town to Wellington took nearly five years to complete. The line to Eersterivier was officially opened on 13 February 1862. Stellenbosch was reached on 1 May 1862 and the railhead at Wellington on 4 November 1863. Work was completed about a year later. From Wellington, the only option for travellers who wished to go further inland was by road across the Bain's Kloof Pass, which had been completed in 1853.

According to the plaque attached to the plinth base of the first locomotive in South Africa at Cape Town station, construction engine no. 9 Blackie had the honour, in 1865, to haul the official inaugural train of the company's Cape Town-Wellington Railway to Welling­ton. The inscription on the plaque is untrue, however, since an engraving which depicts the arrival of the inaugural train at Wellington Station shows the train behind one of these eight  tender locomotives and not behind Blackie, which was probably still a  side-tank locomotive at the time. One of these eight tender engines had hauled the first train from Cape Town to Eersterivier on 13 February 1862 and also the official train during the opening ceremony at Wellington on 4 November 1863.

Cape Government Railways
In 1872, the Cape Government purchased the Cape Town-Wellington and Salt River-Wynberg railways, took over the operation of all railways in the Colony except the Namaqualand Railway and established the Cape Government Railways. Shortly before, it had been decided to continue railway construction from Wellington into the interior, but to use the narrower  gauge, since it would decrease the cost of construction through the difficult terrain beyond the coastal plain and up the Hex River mountains.

While this new line was being constructed, the original Cape Town-Wellington line was dual-gauged, working back from Wellington to Cape Town. The same was done on the Wynberg line. The Cape Town-Wellington and Salt River-Wynberg sections were eventually worked by locomotives of both gauges.

Disposal
The locomotives remained in service until 1881, when sufficient numbers of Cape gauge locomotives were in service and it was decided to remove all broad gauge track and rolling stock. The broad gauge track's  iron rails were lifted and the track was relaid to Cape gauge as rapidly as possible, using  steel rail sections on creosoted wooden sleepers.

All the broad gauge 0-4-2 locomotives were dismantled, with the exception of their boilers. These were thoroughly overhauled, converted into stationary boilers and used to drive workshop machinery.

Works numbers
The locomotive numbers, R and W Hawthorn works numbers and names are listed in the table.

References

0020
0-4-2 locomotives
B1 locomotives
Hawthorn locomotives
Railway locomotives introduced in 1860
1860 in South Africa
4 ft 8½ in gauge locomotives
Scrapped locomotives